Nemesia simoni is a species of spider and can be found in Spain and France.

References 

Nemesiidae
Spiders of Europe
Spiders described in 1874
Taxa named by Octavius Pickard-Cambridge